Bordemar is a Chilean folk andean music band formed in Puerto Montt, Chile.

Its members are professors of music education and formed the band in Puerto Montt in 1983. The name of the band consists of a set of words "Borde del Mar" (English, Edge of the Sea).

They have created openings songs for TV shows such as Tierra Adentro (TVN) and Identidades (Discovery Channel).

Band members

Current members
Fernando Álvarez Macías – vocalist, guitar
Jaime Barría Casanova – keyboards, percussion
Soledad Guarda Andrade – vocalist, violoncello
Eugenia Olavarría – fiddle
Carlos Ralil – western concert flute, saxophone

Former members
Raúl Faure – fiddle
Luis Ritter – western concert flute
Claudio Brellenthin – percussion, guitar
Catherine Hall † – western concert flute
Florencio Jaramillo – fiddle
Felipe Canales – double bass
Juan del Río – fiddle
Daniel Pardo – guita
Mauricio Campos – guitar

Discography

Studio albums
Colores de Chiloé (1987)
Bordevals (1991)
Mar Interior (1994)
Al Abordaje (1998)
E-Mar (2001)
Monte Verde (2014)

Compilation albums
Sur de Chile (1997)
Bordemar 1983-2003 (2003)

Live albums
Música de Bordemar (1984)
Banda Bordemar 2 (1986)

References

External links
Official Website

Chilean folk musical groups